Mango is a small island in Tonga, 9 kilometres south-east of the larger island of Nomuka, and part of the Nomuka or ʻOtu Muʻomuʻa group of islands, which are the southern part of the Haʻapai group. Mango had a population of 62 in the 2021 census.

The island was badly damaged by the 2022 Hunga Tonga–Hunga Ha'apai eruption and tsunami. Following the eruption, a distress call was detected from the island. Images from the New Zealand Defence Force showed that it had suffered "catastrophic" damage, with an entire village destroyed. According to the Tongan government, all homes on the island were destroyed, and a 65-year-old man was killed. After the eruption, the entire island was evacuated, and the inhabitants were bought to Tongatapu by the Tongan Maritime Force. After living at a church hall in Nuku'alofa for almost a year, they were eventually resettled on ʻEua.

References 

Islands of Tonga
Populated places in Haʻapai